Scarlett Ingrid Johansson (born November 22, 1984) is an American actress. The world's highest-paid actress in 2018 and 2019, she has featured multiple times on the Forbes Celebrity 100 list. Time magazine named her one of the 100 most influential people in the world in 2021. Her films have grossed over  billion worldwide, making Johansson the highest-grossing box office star of all time. She has received various accolades, including a Tony Award and a British Academy Film Award, in addition to nominations for two Academy Awards and five Golden Globe Awards.

Born to a Danish father and an American mother, Johansson aspired to be an actress from an early age and first appeared on stage in an off-Broadway play as a child actor. She made her film debut in the fantasy comedy North (1994), and gained early recognition for her roles in Manny & Lo (1996), The Horse Whisperer (1998), and Ghost World (2001). Johansson shifted to adult roles in 2003 with her performances in Lost in Translation, which won her a BAFTA Award for Best Actress, and Girl with a Pearl Earring. She was nominated for Golden Globe Awards for these films, and for playing a troubled teenager in the drama A Love Song for Bobby Long (2004) and a seductress in psychological thriller Match Point (2005). The latter was her first collaboration with Woody Allen, who later directed her in Scoop (2006) and Vicky Cristina Barcelona (2008). Johansson's other works of this period include The Prestige (2006) and the albums Anywhere I Lay My Head (2008) and Break Up (2009), both of which charted on the Billboard 200.

In 2010, Johansson debuted on Broadway in a revival of A View from the Bridge, which won her a Tony Award for Best Featured Actress, and began portraying Black Widow in the Marvel Cinematic Universe film Iron Man 2. She reprised the role in eight films, leading up to her solo feature Black Widow (2021), gaining global stardom. During this period, Johansson starred in the science fiction films Her (2013), Under the Skin (2013) and Lucy (2014). She received two simultaneous Academy Award nominations—Best Actress and Best Supporting Actress—for the respective roles of an actress going through a divorce in the drama Marriage Story (2019) and a single mother in Nazi Germany in the satire Jojo Rabbit (2019), becoming one of the few actors to achieve this feat.

Labeled a sex symbol, Johansson has been referred to as one of the world's most attractive women by various media outlets. She is a prominent brand endorser and supports several charitable causes. Divorced from actor Ryan Reynolds and businessman Romain Dauriac, Johansson has been married to comedian Colin Jost since 2020. She has two children, one with Dauriac and another with Jost.

Early life 

Scarlett Ingrid Johansson was born on November 22, 1984, in the Manhattan borough of New York City. Her father, Karsten Olaf Johansson, is an architect originally from Copenhagen, Denmark. Her paternal grandfather, Ejner Johansson, was an art historian, screenwriter, and film director, whose own father was Swedish. Her mother, New Yorker Melanie Sloan, has worked as a producer; she comes from an Ashkenazi Jewish family who fled Poland and Russia, originally surnamed Schlamberg, and Johansson identifies as Jewish. She has an older sister, Vanessa, also an actress; an older brother, Adrian; and a twin brother, Hunter. She also has an older half-brother, Christian, from her father's first marriage. Johansson holds dual American and Danish citizenship. On a 2017 episode of PBS's Finding Your Roots, she discovered that her maternal great-grandfather's brother and extended family died during the Holocaust in the Warsaw Ghetto.

Johansson attended PS 41, an elementary school in Greenwich Village, Manhattan. Her parents divorced when she was thirteen. She was particularly close to her maternal grandmother, Dorothy Sloan, a bookkeeper and schoolteacher; they often spent time together and Johansson considered Dorothy her best friend. Interested in a career in the spotlight from an early age, Johansson often put on song-and-dance routines for her family. She was particularly fond of musical theater and jazz hands. She took lessons in tap dance, and states that her parents were supportive of her career choice. She has described her childhood as very ordinary.

As a child, Johansson practiced acting by staring in the mirror until she made herself cry, wanting to be like Judy Garland in Meet Me in St. Louis. At age seven, she was devastated when a talent agent signed one of her brothers instead of her, but she later decided to become an actress anyway. She enrolled at the Lee Strasberg Theatre Institute and began auditioning for commercials, but soon lost interest: "I didn't want to promote Wonder Bread." She shifted her focus to film and theater, making her first stage appearance in the off-Broadway play Sophistry with Ethan Hawke, in which she had two lines. Around this time, she began studying at the Professional Children's School, a private educational institution for aspiring child actors in Manhattan.

Acting career

Early work and breakthrough (1994–2002) 
At age nine, Johansson made her film debut as John Ritter's daughter in the fantasy comedy North (1994). She says that when she was on the film set, she knew intuitively what to do. She later played minor roles such as the daughter of Sean Connery's and Kate Capshaw's characters in the mystery thriller Just Cause (1995), and an art student in If Lucy Fell (1996). Johansson's first leading role was as Amanda, the younger sister of a pregnant teenager who runs away from her foster home in Manny & Lo (1996) alongside Aleksa Palladino and her brother, Hunter. Her performance received positive reviews: one written for the San Francisco Chronicle noted, "[the film] grows on you, largely because of the charm of ... Scarlett Johansson," while critic Mick LaSalle, writing for the same paper, commented on her "peaceful aura", and believed, "If she can get through puberty with that aura undisturbed, she could become an important actress." Johansson earned a nomination for the Independent Spirit Award for Best Lead Female for the role.

After appearing in minor roles in Fall and Home Alone 3 (both in 1997), Johansson attracted wider attention for her performance in the film The Horse Whisperer (1998), co-starring director Robert Redford. Based on the 1995 novel of the same name by Nicholas Evans, the drama tells the story of a talented horse trainer, who is hired to help an injured teenager (Johansson) and her horse back to health. Johansson received an "introducing" credit on this film; it was her seventh role. On Johansson's maturity, Redford described her as "13 going on 30". Todd McCarthy of Variety commented that Johansson "convincingly conveys the awkwardness of her age and the inner pain of a carefree girl suddenly laid low by horrible happenstance". For the film, she was nominated for the Chicago Film Critics Association Award for Most Promising Actress. She believed that the film changed many things in her life, realizing that acting is the ability to manipulate one's emotions. On finding good roles as a teenager, Johansson said it was hard for her as adults wrote the scripts and they "portray kids like mall rats and not seriously ... Kids and teenagers just aren't being portrayed with any real depth."

Johansson later appeared in My Brother the Pig (1999) and in the Coen brothers' neo-noir film The Man Who Wasn't There (2001). Her breakthrough came playing a cynical outcast in Terry Zwigoff's black comedy Ghost World (2001), an adaptation of Daniel Clowes' graphic novel of the same name. Johansson auditioned for the film via a tape from New York, and Zwigoff believed her to be "a unique, eccentric person, and right for that part". The film premiered at the 2001 Seattle International Film Festival; although a box office failure, it has since developed a cult status. Johansson was credited with "sensitivity and talent [that] belie her age" by an Austin Chronicle critic and won a Toronto Film Critics Association Award for Best Supporting Actress for her performance.

With David Arquette, Johansson appeared in the horror comedy Eight Legged Freaks (2002) about a collection of spiders exposed to toxic waste, causing them to grow gigantic and begin killing and harvesting. After graduating from Professional Children's School that year, she applied to New York University's Tisch School of the Arts; she decided to focus on her film career when she was rejected.

Transition to adult roles (2003–2004) 
Johansson transitioned from teen to adult roles with two films in 2003: the romantic comedy-drama Lost in Translation and the drama Girl with a Pearl Earring. In the former, directed by Sofia Coppola, she plays Charlotte, a listless and lonely young wife, opposite Bill Murray. Coppola had first noticed Johansson in Manny & Lo, and compared her to a young Lauren Bacall; Coppola based the film's story on the relationship between Bacall and Humphrey Bogart in The Big Sleep (1946). Johansson found the experience of working with a female director different because of Coppola's ability to empathize with her. Made on a budget of $4million, the film grossed $119million at the box office and received critical acclaim. Roger Ebert was pleased with the film and described the lead actors' performances as "wonderful", and Entertainment Weekly wrote of Johansson's "embracing, restful serenity". The New York Times praised Johansson, aged 17 at the time of filming, for playing an older character.

In Peter Webber's Girl with a Pearl Earring, which is based on the novel of the same name by Tracy Chevalier, Johansson played Griet, a young 17th-century servant in the household of the Dutch painter Johannes Vermeer (played by Colin Firth). Webber interviewed 150 actors before casting Johansson. Johansson found the character moving, but did not read the novel, as she thought it was better to approach the story with a fresh start. Girl with a Pearl Earring received positive reviews and was profitable. In his review for The New Yorker, Anthony Lane thought that her presence kept the film "alive", writing, "She is often wordless and close to plain onscreen, but wait for the ardor with which she can summon a closeup and bloom under its gaze; this is her film, not Vermeer's, all the way." Owen Gleiberman of Entertainment Weekly noted her "nearly silent performance", remarking, "The interplay on her face of fear, ignorance, curiosity, and sex is intensely dramatic." She was nominated for the BAFTA Award for Best Actress in a Leading Role and Golden Globe Awards for Best Actress for both films in 2003, winning the former for Lost in Translation.

In Varietys opinion, Johansson's roles in Lost in Translation and Girl with a Pearl Earring established her as among the most versatile actresses of her generation. Johansson had five releases in 2004, three of which—the teen heist film The Perfect Score, the drama A Love Song for Bobby Long, and the drama A Good Woman—were critical and commercial failures. Co-starring with John Travolta, Johansson played a discontented teenager in A Love Song for Bobby Long, which is based on the novel Off Magazine Street by Ronald Everett Capps. David Rooney of Variety wrote that Johansson's and Travolta's performances rescued the film. Johansson earned a Golden Globe Award for Best Actress in a Drama nomination for the film.

In her fourth release in 2004, the live-action animated comedy The SpongeBob SquarePants Movie, Johansson voiced Princess Mindy, the daughter of King Neptune. She agreed to the project because of her love of cartoons, particularly The Ren & Stimpy Show. The film was her most commercially successful release that year. She would then reprise her role as Mindy in the video game adaptation of the film. She followed it with In Good Company, a comedy-drama in which she complicates the life of her father when she dates his much younger boss. Reviews of the film were generally positive, describing it as "witty and charming". Roger Ebert was impressed with Johansson's portrayal, writing that she "continues to employ the gravitational pull of quiet fascination".

Collaborations with Woody Allen (2005–2009) 

Johansson played Nola, an aspiring actress who begins an affair with a married man (played by Jonathan Rhys Meyers) in Woody Allen's drama Match Point in 2005. After replacing Kate Winslet with Johansson for the role, Allen changed the character's nationality from British to American. An admirer of Allen's films, Johansson liked the idea of working with him, but felt nervous her first day on the set. The New York Times was impressed with the performances of Johansson and Rhys Meyers, and Mick LaSalle, writing for the San Francisco Chronicle, stated that Johansson "is a powerhouse from the word go", with a performance that "borders on astonishing". The film, a box office success, earned Johansson nominations for the Golden Globe and the Chicago Film Critics Association Award for Best Supporting Actress. Also that year, Johansson underwent a tonsillectomy and starred with Ewan McGregor in Michael Bay's science fiction film The Island, in dual roles as Sarah Jordan and her clone, Jordan Two Delta. Johansson found her filming schedule exhausting: she had to shoot for 14 hours a day, and she hit her head and injured herself. The film received mixed reviews and grossed $163million against a $126million budget.

Two of Johansson's films in 2006 explored the world of stage magicians, both opposite Hugh Jackman. Allen cast her opposite Jackman and himself in the film Scoop (2006), in which she played a journalism student. The film was a modest worldwide box office success, but polarized critics. Ebert was critical of the film, but found Johansson "lovely as always", and Mick LaSalle noted the freshness she brought to her part. She also appeared in Brian De Palma's The Black Dahlia, a film noir shot in Los Angeles and Bulgaria. Johansson later said she was a fan of DePalma and had wanted to work with him on the film, but thought that she was unsuitable for the part. Anne Billson of The Daily Telegraph likewise found her miscast. However, CNN said that she "takes to the pulpy period atmosphere as if it were oxygen".

Also in 2006, Johansson starred in the short film When the Deal Goes Down to accompany Bob Dylan's song "When the Deal Goes Down..." from the album Modern Times. Johansson had a supporting role of assistant and lover of Jackman's character, an aristocratic magician, in Christopher Nolan's mystery thriller The Prestige (2006). Nolan thought Johansson possessed "ambiguity" and "a shielded quality". She was fascinated with Nolan's directing methods and liked working with him. The film was a critical and box office success, recommended by the Los Angeles Times as "an adult, provocative piece of work". Some critics were skeptical of her performance: Billson again judged her miscast, and Dan Jolin of Empire criticized her English accent.

Johansson's sole release of 2007 was the critically panned comedy-drama The Nanny Diaries alongside Chris Evans and Laura Linney, in which she played a college graduate working as a nanny. Reviews of her performance were mixed; Variety wrote, "[She] essays an engaging heroine", and The New Yorker criticized her for looking "merely confused" while "trying to give the material a plausible emotional center". In 2008, Johansson starred, with Natalie Portman and Eric Bana, in The Other Boleyn Girl, which also earned mixed reviews. Promoting the film, Johansson and Portman appeared on the cover of W, discussing with the magazine the public's reception of them. In Rolling Stone, Pete Travers criticized the film for "[moving] in frustrating herks and jerks", but thought that the duo were the only positive aspect of the production. Variety credited the cast as "almost flawless ... at the top of its game", citing "Johansson's quieter Mary ... as the [film's] emotional center".

In her third collaboration with Woody Allen, the romantic comedy-drama Vicky Cristina Barcelona (2008), which was filmed in Spain, Johansson plays one of the love interests of Javier Bardem's character alongside Penélope Cruz. The film was one of Allen's most profitable and received favorable reviews. A reviewer in Variety described Johansson as "open and malleable" compared to the other actors. She also played the femme fatale Silken Floss in The Spirit, based on the newspaper comic strip of the same name by Will Eisner. It received poor reviews from critics, who deemed it melodramatic, unoriginal, and sexist. Johansson's only role in 2009 was as Anna Marks, a yoga instructor, in the ensemble comedy-drama He's Just Not That into You (2009). The film was released to tepid reviews, but was a box office success.

Marvel Cinematic Universe and worldwide recognition (2010–2013) 
Aspiring to appear on Broadway since childhood, Johansson made her debut in a 2010 revival of Arthur Miller's drama A View from the Bridge. Set in the 1950s in an Italian-American neighborhood in New York, it tells the tragic tale of Eddie (Liev Schreiber), who has an inappropriate love for his wife's orphaned niece, Catherine (Johansson). After initial reservations about playing a teenage character, Johansson was convinced by a friend to take on the part. Ben Brantley of The New York Times wrote Johansson "melts into her character so thoroughly that her nimbus of celebrity disappears". Varietys David Rooney was impressed with the play and Johansson in particular, describing her as the chief performer. She won the 2010 Tony Award for Best Performance by a Featured Actress in a Play. Some critics and Broadway actors criticized the award committee's decision to reward the work of mainstream Hollywood actors, including Johansson. In response, she said that she understood the frustration, but had worked hard for her accomplishments.

Johansson played Black Widow in Jon Favreau's Iron Man 2 (2010), a part of the Marvel Cinematic Universe (MCU). Before she secured the role, she dyed her hair red to convince Favreau that she was right for the part, and undertook stunt and strength training to prepare for the role. Johansson said the character resonated with her, and she admired the superhero's human traits. The film earned $623.9million against its $200million budget, and received generally positive reviews from critics, although reviewers criticized how her character was written. Tim Robey of The Daily Telegraph and Matt Goldberg thought that she had little to do but look attractive. In 2011, Johansson played the role of Kelly, a zookeeper in the family film We Bought a Zoo alongside Matt Damon. The film got mainly favorable reviews, and Anne Billson praised Johansson for bringing depth to a rather uninteresting character. Johansson earned a Teen Choice Award for Choice Movie Actress: Drama nomination for her performance.

Johansson learned some Russian from a former teacher on the phone for her role as Black Widow in The Avengers (2012), another entry from the MCU. The film received mainly positive reviews and broke many box office records, becoming the third highest-grossing film both in the United States and worldwide. For her performance, she was nominated for two Teen Choice Awards and three People's Choice Awards. Later that year, Johansson portrayed actress Janet Leigh in Sacha Gervasi's Hitchcock, a behind-the-scenes drama about the making of Alfred Hitchcock's 1960 film Psycho. Roger Ebert wrote that Johansson did not look much like Leigh, but conveyed her spunk, intelligence, and sense of humor.

In January 2013, Johansson starred in a Broadway revival of Cat on a Hot Tin Roof, directed by Rob Ashford. Set in the Mississippi Delta, it examines the relationships within the family of Big Daddy (Ciarán Hinds), primarily between his son Brick (Benjamin Walker) and Maggie (Johansson). Her performance received mixed reviews. Entertainment Weeklys Thom Geier wrote Johansson "brings a fierce fighting spirit" to her part, but Joe Dziemianowicz from Daily News called her performance "alarmingly one-note". The 2013 Sundance Film Festival hosted the premiere of Joseph Gordon-Levitt's directorial debut, Don Jon. In this romantic comedy-drama, she played the pornography-addicted title character's girlfriend. Gordon-Levitt wrote the role for Johansson, who had previously admired his acting work. The film received positive reviews and Johansson's performance was highlighted by critics. Claudia Puig of USA Today considered it to be one of her best performances.

In 2013, Johansson voiced the character Samantha, a self-aware computer operating system, in Spike Jonze's film Her, replacing Samantha Morton in the role. The film premiered at the 8th Rome International Film Festival, where Johansson won Best Actress; she was also nominated for the Critics' Choice Movie Award for Best Supporting Actress. Johansson was intimidated by the role's complexity, and found her recording sessions for the role challenging but liberating. Peter Travers believed Johansson's voice in the film was "sweet, sexy, caring, manipulative, scary [and] award-worthy". Times Richard Corliss called her performance "seductive and winning", and Her was rated as one of the best films of 2013.
She also won the Saturn Award for Best Supporting Actress at the 40th Saturn Awards in 2014 for her performance. Johansson was cast in Jonathan Glazer's science fiction film Under the Skin (2013) as an extraterrestrial creature disguised as a human femme fatale who preys on men in Scotland. The project, an adaptation of Michel Faber's novel of the same name, took nine years to complete. For the role, she learned to drive a van and speak in an English accent. Johansson improvised conversations with non-professional actors on the street, who did not know they were being filmed. It was released to generally positive reviews, with particular praise for Johansson. Erin Whitney, writing for The Huffington Post, considered it to be her finest performance to that point, and noted that it was her first fully nude role. Author Maureen Foster wrote, "How much depth, breadth, and range Johansson mines from her character's very limited allowance of emotional response is a testament to her acting prowess that is, as the film goes on, increasingly stunning." It earned Johansson a BIFA Award for Best Performance by an Actress in a British Independent Film nomination.

Blockbuster films and critical acclaim (2014–2020) 

Continuing her work in the MCU, Johansson reprised her role as Black Widow in Captain America: The Winter Soldier (2014). In the film, she joins forces with Captain America (Chris Evans) and Falcon (Anthony Mackie) to uncover a conspiracy within S.H.I.E.L.D., while facing a mysterious assassin known as the Winter Soldier. Johansson and Evans wrote their own dialogue for several scenes they had together. Johansson was attracted to her character's way of doing her job, employing her feminine wiles and not her physical appeal. The film was a critical and commercial success, grossing over $714million worldwide. Critic Odie Henderson saw "a genuine emotional shorthand at work, especially from Johansson, who is excellent here". The role earned her a Saturn Award for Best Supporting Actress nomination.

Johansson played a supporting role in the film Chef (2014), alongside Robert Downey, Jr., Sofía Vergara, and director Jon Favreau. It grossed over $45million at the box office and was well received by critics. The Chicago Sun-Times writer Richard Roeper found the film "funny, quirky and insightful, with a bounty of interesting supporting characters". In Luc Besson's science fiction action film Lucy (2014), Johansson starred as the title character, who gains psychokinetic abilities when a nootropic drug is absorbed into her bloodstream. Besson discussed the role with several actresses, and cast Johansson based on her strong reaction to the script and her discipline. Critics generally praised the film's themes, visuals, and Johansson's performance; some found the plot nonsensical. IGN's Jim Vejvoda attributed the film's success to her acting and Besson's style. The film grossed $458million on a budget of $40million to become the 18th highest-grossing film of 2014.

In 2015 and 2016, Johansson again played Black Widow in the MCU films Avengers: Age of Ultron and Captain America: Civil War. During filming of the former, a mixture of close-ups, concealing costumes, stunt doubles and visual effects were used to hide her pregnancy. Both films earned more than $1.1billion, ranking among the highest-grossing films of all time. For Civil War, Johansson earned her second nomination for Critics' Choice Movie Award for Best Actress in an Action Movie and her fourth for Saturn Award for Best Supporting Actress. Earlier in 2016, Johansson had featured in the Coen brothers' well-received comedy film Hail, Caesar! about a "fixer" working in the classical Hollywood cinema, trying to discover what happened to a cast member who vanished during the filming of a biblical epic; Johansson plays an actress who becomes pregnant while her film is in production. She also voiced Kaa in Jon Favreau's live-action adaptation of Disney's  The Jungle Book, and Ash in the animated musical comedy film Sing (both 2016). That year she also narrated an audiobook of Lewis Carroll's children's novel Alice's Adventures in Wonderland.

Johansson played Motoko Kusanagi in Rupert Sanders's 2017 film adaptation of the Ghost in the Shell franchise. The film was praised for its visual style, acting, and cinematography, but was the subject of controversy for whitewashing the cast, particularly Johansson's character, a cyborg who was meant to hold the memories of a Japanese woman. Responding to the backlash, the actress asserted she would never play a non-white character, but wanted to take the rare opportunity to star in a female-led franchise. Ghost in the Shell grossed $169.8million worldwide against a production budget of $110million. In March 2017, Johansson hosted Saturday Night Live for the fifth time, making her the 17th person and the fourth woman to enter the NBC sketch comedy's prestigious Five-Timers Club. Johansson's next 2017 film was the comedy Rough Night, where she played Jess Thayer, one of the five friends—alongside Kate McKinnon, Jillian Bell, Ilana Glazer, and Zoë Kravitz—whose bachelorette party goes wrong after a male stripper dies. The film had a mixed critical reception and moderate box office returns. In 2018, Johansson voiced show dog Nutmeg in Wes Anderson's stop-motion animated film Isle of Dogs, released in March, and reprised her MCU role as Black Widow in Avengers: Infinity War, which followed the next month. Johansson was due to star in Rub & Tug, a biographical film in which she would have played Dante "Tex" Gill, a transgender man who operated a massage parlor and prostitution ring in the 1970s and 1980s. She dropped out of the project following backlash to the casting of a cisgender woman to play a transgender man.

In 2019, Johansson once again reprised her role as Black Widow in Avengers: Endgame, which is the highest-grossing film of all time. She next starred in Noah Baumbach's Netflix film Marriage Story in which Adam Driver and she played a warring couple who file for divorce. Johansson found a connection with her character as she was amid her own divorce proceedings at the time. Peter Bradshaw of The Guardian commended her "brilliantly textured" performance in it. She also took on the supporting role of a young boy's mother who shelters a Jewish girl in Nazi Germany in Taika Waititi's satire Jojo Rabbit. Waititi modeled the character on his own mother and cast Johansson to provide her a rare opportunity to perform comedy. The film received polarized reviews, but Stephanie Zacharek labeled her the "lustrous soul of the movie". Johansson received her first two Academy Award nominations, for Best Actress and Best Supporting Actress for her performances in Marriage Story and Jojo Rabbit, respectively, becoming the twelfth performer to be nominated for two Oscars in the same year. She also received two BAFTA nominations for these films and a Golden Globe nomination for the former.

Black Widow and lawsuit (2021–present) 
After a one-year screen absence, Johansson reprised her role as Black Widow in her own solo prequel film in 2021, on which she also served as an executive producer. Also starring Florence Pugh, the film is set after the events of Captain America: Civil War and sees Johansson's character on the run and forced to confront her past. Johansson felt that her work playing the role was then complete. She saw this as an opportunity to show her character's ability to be on her own and make choices for herself while facing difficult times and noted that her vulnerability distinguished her from other Avengers. Critics were generally favorable in their reviews of the film, mainly praising Johansson and Pugh's performances. The Hollywood Reporter David Rooney thought the film was "a stellar vehicle" for Johansson, and Pete Hammond of Deadline Hollywood found her "again a great presence in the role, showing expert action and acting chops throughout". For the film, Johansson won The Female Movie Star of 2021 at the 47th People's Choice Awards.

In July 2021, Johansson filed a lawsuit against Disney claiming that the simultaneous release of Black Widow on their streaming service Disney+ breached a clause in her contract that the film receive exclusive theatrical release. She alleged that the release on Disney+ exempted her from receiving additional bonus from box-office profits, to which she was entitled. In response, Disney said her lawsuit showed an indifference to the "horrific and prolonged" effects of the COVID-19 pandemic. The company also stated that Johansson already received $20million for the film and that the Disney+ Premier Access release would only earn her additional compensation. The Hollywood Reporter described Disney's response as "aggressive". Creative Artists Agency co-chairman Bryan Lourd thought the company falsely portraying Johansson as insensitive to the effects of the pandemic was a "direct attack on her character". Lourd further stated that the company including her salary in their public statement was an attempt to "weaponize her success as an artist and businesswoman". Later that September, both parties announced that they had resolved their dispute; the terms of the settlement remained undisclosed.

Johansson reprised her voice role as Ash in the sequel Sing 2 (2021). She will next star alongside an ensemble cast in Wes Anderson's romance Asteroid City and in Kristin Scott Thomas's directorial debut My Mother's Wedding. She will also star in two films for Apple TV+: Bride, from director Sebastián Lelio, and Project Artemis, opposite Channing Tatum.

Music career 

In 2006, Johansson sang the track "Summertime" for Unexpected Dreams – Songs from the Stars, a non-profit collection of songs recorded by Hollywood actors. She performed with the Jesus and Mary Chain for a Coachella reunion show in Indio, California, in April 2007. The following year, Johansson appeared as the leading lady in Justin Timberlake's music video, for "What Goes Around... Comes Around", which was nominated for an MTV Video Music Award for Video of the Year.

In May 2008, Johansson released her debut album Anywhere I Lay My Head, which consists of one original song and ten cover versions of Tom Waits songs, and features David Bowie and members from the Yeah Yeah Yeahs and Celebration. Reviews of the album were mixed. Spin was not particularly impressed with Johansson's singing. Some critics found it to be "surprisingly alluring", "a bravely eccentric selection", and "a brilliant album" with "ghostly magic". NME named the album the "23rd best album of 2008", and it peaked at number126 on the Billboard 200. Johansson started listening to Waits when she was 11 or 12 years old, and said of him, "His melodies are so beautiful, his voice is so distinct and I had my own way of doing Tom Waits songs."

In September 2009, Johansson and singer-songwriter Pete Yorn released a collaborative album, Break Up, inspired by Serge Gainsbourg's duets with Brigitte Bardot. The album reached number 41 in the US. In 2010, Steel Train released Terrible Thrills Vol.1, which includes their favorite female artists singing songs from their self-titled album. Johansson is the first artist on the album, singing "Bullet". Johansson sang "One Whole Hour" for the 2011 soundtrack of the documentary film Wretches & Jabberers (2010). and in 2012 sang on a J.Ralph track entitled "Before My Time" for the end credits of the climate documentary Chasing Ice (2012)

In February 2015, Johansson formed a band called the Singles with Este Haim from HAIM, Holly Miranda, Kendra Morris, and Julia Haltigan. The group's first single was called "Candy". Johansson was issued a cease and desist order from the lead singer of the Los Angeles-based rock band the Singles, demanding she stop using their name. In 2016, she performed "Trust in Me" for The Jungle Book soundtrack and "Set It All Free" and "I Don't Wanna" for Sing: Original Motion Picture Soundtrack. In 2018, Johansson collaborated with Pete Yorn again for an EP titled Apart, released June 1.

Public image 
Some media and fans call Johansson "ScarJo", which she finds lazy, flippant, and insulting. She has no social media profiles, saying she does not see the need "to continuously share details of [her] everyday life."

Johansson is described as a sex symbol by the media. The Sydney Morning Herald describes her as "the embodiment of male fantasy". During the filming of Match Point, director Woody Allen remarked upon her attractiveness, calling her "beautiful" and "sexually overwhelming". In 2014, The New Yorker film critic Anthony Lane wrote that "she is evidently, and profitably, aware of her sultriness, and of how much, down to the last inch, it contributes to the contours of her reputation." Johansson has expressed displeasure at being sexualized and maintains that a preoccupation with one's attractiveness does not last. She lost the role of Lisbeth Salander in The Girl with the Dragon Tattoo (2011) because the film's director David Fincher found her "too sexy" for the part.

Johansson ranks highly in various beauty listings. Maxim included her in their Hot 100 list from 2006 to 2014. She has been named "Sexiest Woman Alive" twice by Esquire (2006 and 2013) and has been included in similar listings by Playboy (2007), Men's Health (2011), and FHM (since 2005). She was named GQs Babe of the Year in 2010. Madame Tussauds New York museum unveiled a wax statue of her in 2015.

Johansson was invited to join the Academy of Motion Picture Arts and Sciences in June 2004. In 2006, she appeared on Forbes Celebrity 100 list and again in 2014, 2015, 2018 and 2019. She received a star on the Hollywood Walk of Fame in May 2012. In 2021, she appeared on the Time 100, Times annual list of the 100 most influential people in the world. Johansson was included on Forbes annual list of the world's highest-paid actresses from 2014 to 2016, with respective earnings of $17million, $35.5million, and $25million. She would later top the list in 2018 and 2019, with earnings of $40.5million and $56million, respectively. She was the highest-grossing actor of 2016, with a total of $1.2billion. As a result, IndieWire credited her for taking on risky roles. , her films have grossed over  billion in North America and over  billion worldwide, making Johansson the third-highest-grossing box-office star of all time both domestically and worldwide as well as the highest-grossing actress of all time in North America.

Johansson has appeared in advertising campaigns for Calvin Klein, Dolce & Gabbana, L'Oréal, and Louis Vuitton and has represented the Spanish brand Mango since 2009. She was the first Hollywood celebrity to represent a champagne producer, appearing in advertisements for Moët & Chandon. In January 2014, the Israeli company SodaStream, which makes home-carbonation products, hired Johansson as its first global brand ambassador, a relationship that commenced with a television commercial during Super Bowl XLVIII on February 2, 2014. This created some controversy, as SodaStream at that time operated a plant in Israeli-occupied territory in the West Bank.

Personal life 
While attending the Professional Children's School, Johansson dated classmate Jack Antonoff from 2001 to 2002. She dated her Black Dahlia co-star Josh Hartnett for about two years until the end of 2006. According to Hartnett, they broke up because their busy schedules kept them apart. Johansson began dating Canadian actor Ryan Reynolds in 2007. They became engaged in May 2008, married in September 2008 on Vancouver Island, separated in December 2010 and divorced in July 2011.

In November 2012, Johansson began dating Frenchman Romain Dauriac, the owner of an advertising agency. They became engaged the following September. The pair divided their time between New York City and Paris. She gave birth to their daughter in 2014. Johansson and Dauriac married that October in Philipsburg, Montana. They separated in mid-2016 and divorced in September 2017. Johansson began dating Saturday Night Live co-head writer and Weekend Update co-host Colin Jost in May 2017. In May 2019, the two were engaged. They married in October 2020, at their New York home. She gave birth to their son in August 2021. Johansson resides in New York and Los Angeles.

In September 2011, nude photographs of Johansson hacked from her cell phone were leaked online. She said the pictures had been sent to her then-husband, Ryan Reynolds, three years prior to the incident. Following an FBI investigation, the hacker was arrested, pled guilty, and was sentenced to ten years in prison. In 2014, Johansson won a lawsuit against French publisher JC Lattès over libelous statements about her relationships in the novel The First Thing We Look At by Grégoire Delacourt. She was awarded $3,400; she had claimed $68,000.

Johansson has criticized the media for promoting an image that causes unhealthy diets and eating disorders among women. In an essay she wrote for The Huffington Post, she encouraged people to maintain a healthy body. She posed nude for the March 2006 cover of Vanity Fair alongside actress Keira Knightley and fully clothed fashion designer Tom Ford. The photograph sparked controversy as some believed it demonstrated that women are forced to flaunt their sexuality more often than men.

Other ventures

Philanthropy 
Johansson has supported various charitable organizations including Aid Still Required, Cancer Research UK, Stand Up To Cancer, Too Many Women (which works against breast cancer), and USA Harvest, which provides food for people in need. In 2005, Johansson became a global ambassador for the aid and development agency Oxfam. In 2007, she took part in the anti-poverty campaign ONE, which was organized by U2's lead singer Bono. In March 2008, a UK-based bidder paid £20,000 on an eBay auction to benefit Oxfam, winning a hair and makeup treatment, a pair of tickets, and a chauffeured trip to accompany her on a 20-minute date to the world premiere of He's Just Not That into You.

In January 2014, Johansson resigned from her Oxfam position after criticism of her promotion of SodaStream, whose main factory was based in Mishor Adumim, an Israeli settlement in the West Bank; Oxfam opposes all trade with such Israeli settlements. Oxfam stated that it was thankful for her contributions in raising funds to fight poverty. Together with her Avengers costars, Johansson raised $500,000 for the victims of Hurricane Maria.

In 2018, she collaborated with 300 women in Hollywood to set up the Time's Up initiative to protect women from harassment and discrimination. Johansson took part in the Women's March in Los Angeles in January 2018, where she spoke on topics such as abuses of power, sharing her own experience. She received backlash for calling out fellow actor James Franco on allegations of sexual misconduct as in the past she had defended working with Woody Allen amid an accusation by his daughter Dylan Farrow.

Johansson has given support to Operation Warrior Wellness, a division of the David Lynch Foundation that helps veterans learn Transcendental Meditation. Her grand-uncle, Phillip Schlamberg, was the last American pilot to have been killed during WWII. He had gone on a bombing mission with Jerry Yellin, who went on to become co-founder of Operation Warrior Wellness.

Politics 

Johansson was registered as an independent, at least through 2008, and campaigned for Democratic candidate John Kerry in the 2004 United States presidential election. When George W. Bush was re-elected in 2004, she said she was disappointed.

In January 2008, her campaign for Democratic candidate Barack Obama included appearances in Iowa targeted at younger voters, an appearance at Cornell College, and a speaking engagement at Carleton College in Northfield, Minnesota, on Super Tuesday, 2008. Johansson appeared in the music video for rapper will.i.am's song, "Yes We Can" (2008), directed by Jesse Dylan; the song was inspired by Obama's speech after the 2008 New Hampshire primary. In February 2012, Johansson and Anna Wintour hosted a fashion launch of clothing and accessories, whose proceeds went to the Obama's re-election campaign. She addressed voters at the Democratic National Convention in September 2012, calling for Obama's re-election and for more engagement from young voters. She encouraged women to vote for Obama and condemned Mitt Romney for his opposition to Planned Parenthood.

Johansson publicly endorsed and supported Manhattan Borough President Scott Stringer's 2013 run for New York City Comptroller by hosting a series of fundraisers. To encourage people to vote in the 2016 presidential election, in which Johansson endorsed Hillary Clinton, she appeared in a commercial alongside her Marvel Cinematic Universe co-star Robert Downey Jr., and Joss Whedon. In 2017, she spoke at the Women's March on Washington, addressing Donald Trump's presidency and stating that she would support the president if he works for women's rights and stops withdrawing federal funding for Planned Parenthood. In the 2020 Democratic presidential primaries, Johansson endorsed Elizabeth Warren, referring to Warren as "thoughtful and progressive but realistic".

In December 2020, three members of the Egyptian Initiative for Personal Rights, an Egyptian civil rights organization, were released from prison in Egypt, after Johansson had described their detention circumstances and demanded the trio's release.

Notes

See also 
 List of actors with Academy Award nominations
 List of actors with two or more Academy Award nominations in acting categories
 List of actors nominated for two Academy Awards in the same year

References

Further reading

External links

 
 
 

 
1984 births
Living people
20th-century American actresses
21st-century American actresses
21st-century American women singers
21st-century American singers
Actresses from New York City
American child actresses
American film actresses
American people of Danish descent
American people of Polish-Jewish descent
American people of Russian-Jewish descent
American people of Swedish descent
American stage actresses
American voice actresses
American women film producers
Atco Records artists
Best Actress BAFTA Award winners
César Honorary Award recipients
Danish people of Polish-Jewish descent
Danish people of Russian-Jewish descent
Danish people of Swedish descent
Female models from New York (state)
Fraternal twin actresses
Jewish American actresses
Jewish women singers
Lee Strasberg Theatre and Film Institute alumni
Method actors
People from Manhattan
Theatre World Award winners
Tony Award winners
American twins
United Service Organizations entertainers